Drumgoole Plaza is a public park that sits below the ramps to the Brooklyn Bridge in Manhattan, New York City, on Frankfort Street between Park Row and Gold Street, and next to the main building of Pace University at One Pace Plaza. Opened on November 5, 2003, the park is maintained by Pace under the management of the New York City Department of Parks and Recreation.

History

Drumgoole Plaza was the first of the 13 public open spaces renovated or created with funds from Lower Manhattan Development Corporation to revitalize Lower Manhattan. after the September 11 attacks.

The Department of Parks & Recreation and Pace University reconstructed an empty lot into a sitting area with 1964 New York World's Fair benches. Other features include decorative paving, granite and concrete curbs, and streetlights for public safety and to illuminate the bridge structure. The landscaping added around 20 new trees, with species including goldenrains, honey locusts and hollies. 1,100 shrubs were added, including perennials, ornamental grasses such as winter hazel, hydrangea, blue star, and striped ribbon grass. Nets keep birds away.

The plaza had been named in 1989 in honor of John Christopher Drumgoole (1816–1888), a hero of New York newsboys who thronged the area when Park Row was the headquarters of New York City’s major newspapers, including The New York Times, in the building Pace now occupies at 41 Park Row. Drumgoole, who joined the priesthood in midlife, worked to help homeless youth.

See also  
 List of parks in New York City

References

External links 

 New York City Department of Parks & Recreation

Parks in Manhattan
Pocket parks
Civic Center, Manhattan